Daniel Babu Paul (11 April 1941 – 12 April 2019) was an Indian civil servant, writer, member of the Indian Administrative Service and member Ombudsman for local self-government institutions of Kerala during 2000–2001. He was the Former Finance Secretary, Government of Kerala. He retired in the rank of Chief Secretary.

He was a member of Kerala Infrastructure Investment Fund Board (KIIFB).

The State Government of Kerala has decided to establish a Research Centre to perpetuate the memory of Late D. Babu Paul, who has served the state in various capacities. Further, it would also rename the Civil Service Academy after Dr. Paul.

Personal life
D. Babu Paul was born to Fr. Paulose Cheerothottam Kor Episcopa, a Jacobite priest and headmaster, and Mary Paul, a teacher on 11 April 1941. His brother is K. Roy Paul, a former member of UPSC. He was a rank holder in class X (10th grade) and completed his Pre-degree from Union Christian College, Aluva. After his bachelor's degree in civil engineering from College of Engineering, Trivandrum. He secured 7th rank (All India) in the Civil Service Examination and First rank in South India. 

He died at 11:30 PM on 12 April 2019, at the age of 78. His death came a day after his 78th birthday, and was caused by a massive heart attack.

His wife Anna Nirmala Babu Paul  (1943–2000), was the former president of YWCA Trivandrum and secretary of The Trivandrum's Women Club. She was also a member of the Censor Board of Film Certification. He is survived by children Cherian Paul and Mariam Joseph.

Career

Babu Paul held the following offices: 
Vice Chancellor of Kerala University; 
Lecturer in Civil Engineering; 
Additional Chief Secretary in the rank of Chief Secretary of State [1998–2000]; 
First Member, Board of Revenue, and Principal Secretary to Government, Tourism, Information and Cultural Affairs, also in the rank of Chief Secretary; Principal Secretary to Govt, Tourism, Information & Cultural Affairs [1996–1998]; 
Second Member, Board of Revenue, in charge of Land Revenue and Transport Commissioner Secretary to Government, General Education [1988–96]; 
Chairman, Cochin Port Trust [1984–88]; 
Finance Secretary, Kerala State [1982–84]; 
Secretary to Government, Transport, Fisheries and Ports [1980–82]; 
Expenditure Secretary, Kerala State [1979–80]; 
Chief Executive, State Road Transport Corporation [1977–79]; 
Managing Director, Travancore Titanium [1975–77]; 
Project Coordinator, Idukki Hydel Project & District Collector [1971–75]; 
District Collector, Palakkad [1970–71]; 
Managing Director, Handloom Development Corporation [1968–70]; 
Sub Collector Assistant Collector [Under Training]. He was a member of Kerala Infrastructure Investment Fund Board.

Books and writings
Babu Paul published his first book at the age of 19. The book Oru Yathrayude Ormakal was written in memory of his trip to Europe to participate in the International Students' Conference. His Autobiographical Service story "Katha Ithuvare" was published in 2001. He is the writer of the first Malayalam Bible Dictionary Veda Sabda Rathnakaran. He also wrote - A Queen's Story: Five Centuries of Cochin Port. He has written various other English and Malayalam books.

A list of books authored by him includes:

 1962 Oru Yatayude Ormakal
 1971 Utharasyam Disi
 1976 Giriparvam
 1980 Kremlin Berlin
 1980 Eee Paara Mel
 1986 Nippon no omoyde
 1988 Achan, Achan, Acharyan
 1997 Socrateesum Sundaran Nadarum
 1997 Vedasabdaratnakaranm
 1998 Pralayangalude Pralayangalude
 2003 Ennu Ezhutappettirikkunnu
 2004 Aluvappuzha Pinneyum Ozhukunnu
 2004 Nilavil Virinja Kappippookkal
 2004 Eee Muttathu Oru Mullassery Undayirunnu
 2007 Pallikkentinu Palliikkoodam
 2008 Katha Itu Ware
 2009 Pattom Mutal Oommen Chandi Ware
 2009 Ormakalku Seershakamilla
 2009 Sambhavami YugeYuge
 2009 Yatrakkidayil
 2010 Chila Cheria Valiya Karyangal
 2010 Kuttikalude Bible
 2011 Anurananam
 2011 Rekhayanam
 2012 Goodbye VS
 2012 Ormakalude Padippura
 2012 Ulpathirahasyam
 2013 Viswasapramanagal Veekshanaviharangal
 2013 Francis Weendum Wannu
 2014 Kristubhagavadgita
 2014 Vocabur Fransiscos
 2015 Nanmayilekkoru Teerthadanam
 2016 Aksharangal Nakshatrangal
 2017 Bibililekkoru Kilivatil

Awards 
Babu Paul received numerous awards for his Bible dictionary, Veda Shabda Ratnakaram. They are as follows: Honorary Doctorate from Damascus St. Efraim Unity; Gundert Award presented by International School of Dravidian Languages for the best dictionary in Dravidian language; Guruvayoor Nair Samajam Award; Alexander Marthoma Award; N V Sahitya Puraskaram; Samskara Deepam Award by Indian Institution of Christian Studies, and a fellowship conferred by the same; Christian Literary Award, Kerala History Association Award for Queen's Story which is the history of Cochin port; Sophia Award for the total contribution in the field of culture; MAGA Award from the Malayali Association for his contributions to the cultural development of Kerala; M. K. K. Nair Award for exhibiting interest in temple arts; Bar Eto briro Award (The highest a lay man can aspire for in the Syrian Orthodox Church, the only recipient in India); Rajiv Gandhi Award for his excellence in Civil Service.

Awards received by him include the following:

 Forala History Association Award for the work, A Queen's Story Five Centuries of Cochin Port
 Kerala Sahitya Akademi Award for Vedasabdaratnakaram
 ISDL's Gundert Award 
 NVSahitya Puraskaram 
 YMCA Ernakulam 
 Christian Reformation Literature Society
 Samskaradeepam Award 
 Fellowship of the Indian Institute for Christian Studies
 KCBC Media Award
 Faith Award
 Vedaratnam Award
 Kudumbaratna Puraskaram
 C Sankaranarayanan Media Award for the Best Columnist (2013)
 Fr. Vadakkan Award
 Marthoma Mathews I Award
 World Malayali Council Award (2015)
 Panditaratna Puraskaram
 Tunchan Smaraka Samiti Acharyavandanam
 Guruvayoor Nair Samajam Award
 Paramacharya Puraskaram (2012)
 Kerala Cultural Award
 M. K. K. Nair Award (2000)
 Travel Agents Association of India Award
 Valiyadivanji Raja Kesavadasan Award
 Rajiv Gandhi Award (1999)
 Vaikom Muhammed Basheer Puraskaram
 Sukumar Azhikode Smaraka Puraskaram (2017)
 Musaliar Award (2018)
 Fine Arts Society Fellowship (FAS Perumbavoor)
 Sri Mahalakshmi Puraskaram (2017)
 Janasewa Puraskaram (2012)
 Alexander Marthoma Award (1998)
 Sophia Award
 Navaratri Trust Award (2018)

References

Sources
 Babu Paul
https://www.newindianexpress.com/cities/thiruvananthapuram/2019/apr/29/babu-pauls-life-worthy-of-emulation-says-pinarayi-1970232.html

1941 births
2019 deaths
Malayalam-language writers
20th-century Indian male writers
Academic staff of the University of Kerala
Saint Thomas Christians
Indian Administrative Service officers from Kerala
Civil Servants from Kerala
Recipients of the Kerala Sahitya Akademi Award